Froud is the surname of the following people:

Brian Froud (born 1947), English fantasy illustrator 
Brian Froud (actor), Canadian actor, voice actor and voice director
Ethel Froud (1880–1941), British trade unionist and feminist
Gordon Froud (born 1963), South African artist and curator 
Harry Froud (1898–1951), Australian rules footballer 
Susan Froud (born 1970), Canadian curler
Wendy Froud, American sculptor and puppet-maker 

English-language surnames